Chválenice is a municipality and village in Plzeň-City District in the Plzeň Region of the Czech Republic. It has about 800 inhabitants.

Administrative parts
Villages of Chouzovy and Želčany are administrative parts of Chválenice.

References

Villages in Plzeň-City District